= Porana Bhagpur =

- Town
- Location within Pakistan
- Coordinates: 33.18°N 73.19°E
- Country: Pakistan
- Province: (Islamabad Capital Territory) Islamabad C.T
- Elevation: 435 m (1,427 ft)
- Time zone: UTC+5 (PST)

Porana Bhagpur is a town in the Islamabad Capital Territory of Pakistan. It is located at 33° 18' 40N 73° 19' 45E with an altitude of 435 metres (1430 feet).
